People's Front is a Marxist-Leninist mass organization in the Republic of Turkey.

Organization
 Youth organization - Revolutionary Youth 
 Trade union - Revolutionary Workers Movement
 Lawyers organization - People's Law Office
 Engineers organization - Engineer Architects of the People
 Prisoner support organization - TAYAD

Activity

Halk Cephesi works on issues such as solving social problems such as drug addiction, prostitution, gentrification. Halk Cephesi is active mostly in poor neighborhoods in Istanbul where it also has associations named "Hasan Ferit Gedik Center for Struggle and Liberation Against Drugs" which acts as a rehabilitation centre for those addicted to drugs. Public officials, hold the view that the People's Front is related to the DHKP-C.

Events
On 29 September 2013 Hasan Ferit Gedik, young activist of Halk Cephesi was killed by drug gang in Maltepe. Members of People's Front opened clinic the Hasan Ferit Gedik Center for Struggle and Liberation from Drugs

On 28-29 October 2020, close to 100 people from Halk Cephesi were arrested in raids across 12 provinces in Turkey

International relations
People's Front is one of founder-members of the Anti-Imperialist Front, and organised yearly International Symposium against Imperialist Aggression. in Istanbul.

See also
 Grup Yorum
 Popular front

References

Bibliography
 Halk Cephesi 2014
 The Front for rights and freedom

External links
Halkın Sesi
Istanbul's Gentrification Wars Vice's reportage on YouTube
Communist organizations in Turkey
Revolutionary People's Liberation Party/Front